Bailleulmont is a commune in the Pas-de-Calais department in the Hauts-de-France region of France.

Geography
Bailleulmont is a farming village located 8 miles (13 km) southwest of Arras at the junction of the D1 and D66 roads.

Population

Sights
 The church of St. Martin, dating from the eighteenth century.
 The ruined keep and motte of a 13th-century castle, inscribed as a monument historique by the French Ministry of Culture in 1947.

See also
Communes of the Pas-de-Calais department

References

Communes of Pas-de-Calais